Sunsari District court lies at Sunsari District, Nepal. It was established to inspect, supervise and issue necessary instructions to its subordinate judicial institutions under Clause 148, 149, 150 and 151 of Constitution of Nepal, 2015.

Appointment 
The Chief Justice of Nepal appoints judges of the District court on the recommendation of the Judicial Council.

Judges

See also
District Courts of Nepal

References
 
Courts in Nepal